Caig may refer to:

People
 John Caig, designer of Blaze (dinghy)
 Dave Caig, founder of Accuracy International
 Tony Caig (born 1974), English football goalkeeper

Other
 CAIG Sky Wing
 CAIG Wing Loong
 CAIG Wing Loong II

See also
 McCaig